Gikondi is a settlement in Kenya's Central Province.
Bikini Secondary School is located here, also kaharo secondary and primary school

References 

Populated places in Central Province (Kenya)